The University of Wisconsin–Stevens Point (UW–Stevens Point or UWSP) is a public university in Stevens Point, Wisconsin. It is part of the University of Wisconsin System and grants associate, baccalaureate, and master's degrees, as well as doctoral degrees in audiology and educational sustainability. As of 2018, UW-Stevens Point has merged with UW-Stevens Point at Wausau and UW-Stevens Point at Marshfield.

History
After securing land and funding from the City of Stevens Point and Portage County and winning the right to host the new normal school, Stevens Point Normal School opened on September 17, 1894, with 201 students. In addition to teacher preparation, "domestic science" (home economics) and conservation education were offered; the latter formed the basis for the College of Natural Resources.

In 1927, Stevens Point Normal School became Central State Teachers College and began offering four-year teaching degrees. When post-World War II enrollment became less centered on teacher training and more focused on liberal arts education, the Wisconsin State Legislature intervened, changing the school's name to Wisconsin State College–Stevens Point with the authority to grant bachelor's degrees in liberal arts.

In 1940, William C. Hansen began his 22-year tenure as the institution's longest-serving president. Ever larger numbers of students in the 1950s and 1960s led to construction on campus throughout the 1960s and early 1970s. It was during this period, in 1964, that the college was elevated to university status as Wisconsin State University–Stevens Point and began offering graduate degrees. Seven years later, the Wisconsin State Universities merged into the University of Wisconsin system, and the school adopted its current name. UW-Stevens Point has more than 77,000 alumni. More than half of these alumni live in Wisconsin. In 1968, UW-Stevens Point formed the Northwoods battalion, an ROTC unit for the United States army.

Lee S. Dreyfus became chancellor in 1974 before becoming Wisconsin's 40th governor. Governor Dreyfus was inaugurated on the lawn in front of Old Main on the UW-Stevens Point campus in 1979.

In 2007, a sustainability task force was created to help achieve the future goal of a carbon neutral campus.

In 2009, Chancellor Linda Bunnell resigned after a student vote of no-confidence.  The vote in part was called because of an automobile accident she failed to report and allegations of drunken driving. Bernie Patterson became chancellor in July 2010.

The campus hosted the Jacksonville Jaguars of the National Football League for their first training camp in 1995. It was part of what then was known as the Cheese League, a collection of teams that conducted training camp in Wisconsin. Since 1996, the Jaguars have conducted their training camp in Jacksonville.

Campus

The university is in Stevens Point, Wisconsin, a block north of State Route 66 and southwest of Interstate 39/U.S. Route 51. It is a  campus with 43 buildings, including a  nature preserve and  lake.

The Greek community on campus consists of four sororities and four fraternities. All the Greek organizations meet and collaborate as one, known as the Inter-Greek Council. The sororities on campus are Delta Phi Epsilon, Gamma Phi Delta Sorority, Phi Omega, and Sigma Delta Rho. The fraternities on campus are Phi Sigma Phi, Sigma Tau Gamma, Phi Mu Alpha Sinfonia, and Theta Xi.

The Schmeeckle Reserve, a nature reserve, is on campus.

Academics 
The University of Wisconsin–Stevens Point offers more than 120 undergraduate programs in 48 majors and 78 minors. These programs are housed within four colleges:
 College of Fine Arts and Communication, which includes opportunities in the visual and performing arts;
 College of Letters and Science, which includes disciplines in the natural and social sciences, mathematics, computing and humanities;
 College of Natural Resources, with disciplines such as forestry and wildlife ecology; and
College of Professional Studies, featuring business and economics, health-related fields and the School of Education

Rankings 
In 2018 U.S. News & World Report ranked UW-Stevens Point 12th among regional universities in the Midwest.

Satellite locations
UW-Stevens Point has two satellite campuses, in Marshfield and Wausau.

The university has three off-site field stations: Central Wisconsin Environmental Station (CWES) at Amherst Junction, Treehaven near Tomahawk, and the Northern Aquaculture Demonstration Facility at Bayfield. CWES is on 200 acres near Sunset Lake, 17 miles east of Stevens Point. Treehaven is between Tomahawk and Rhinelander, Wisconsin on 1,400 acres. The Northern Aquaculture Demonstration Facility is at 36445 State Highway 13, 1.5 miles west of Red Cliff on Highway 13, near Lake Superior.

Centers
The university maintains a wide range of centers and affiliations, including the Museum of Natural History, Wisconsin Center for Wildlife, Waste Education Center, Water and Environmental Analysis Lab, Aber Suzuki Center, Allen F. Blocher Planetarium, Arthur J. Pejsa Observatory, Center for Collaborative & Interactive Technologies, Center for Economic Education, CPS Café, Central Wisconsin Economic Research Bureau, Gesell Institute, Center for Athletic Scheduling, Center for the Small City and Community Research Center.

Sustainability 
UW-Stevens Point works towards waste reduction and diversion and recognizes the need to move toward a zero-waste campus by continuing to reduce, reuse and recycle more each year. The university is committed to reducing energy consumption through conservation and efficiency, and offsetting its total carbon emissions through green electricity purchases, composting and managed forests.

Media

Radio station
WWSP-FM is the University of Wisconsin–Stevens Point's alternative radio station. Operating at 30,000 watts, WWSP broadcasts commercial free on 89.9FM 24/7/365. '90FM' is the largest student-run radio station in the Midwest and hosts the world's largest trivia contest, which was founded in 1969 and has since become a tradition for the university and the community. Hundreds of teams with thousands of members participate in the contest every year, usually in April.

Television station 
SPTV is a student-operated television station at UW Stevens Point. It is broadcast on channel 98 and online on SPTV's website. SPTV's office and studios are in the Communication Arts Center on the UWSP campus. The station airs news, sports, and entertainment shows.

Newspaper
The Pointer, the weekly student newspaper, is free to all tuition-paying students.

Athletics

Student athletes in 20 sports at UW-Stevens Point participate in the NCAA Division III. The teams are members of the Wisconsin Intercollegiate Athletic Conference (WIAC). UW-Stevens Point has 13 NCAA Division III National Team Titles and 49 NCAA Division III Individual Titles, and is ranked 35th out of 441 NCAA schools. In 2019 it received the Learfield Sports Director's Cup. Students can also participate in 26 "club" sports and dozens of intramural offerings, Including Esports.

Notable alumni

Andrea Anders, television actress
Mark E. Anderson, U.S. National Guard Major General
Margaret Ashmun, teacher and writer
Jenny Baeseman, polar researcher
James Baumgart, politician
Kirk Baumgartner, football player
Tim Bedore, comedian
Kathi Bennett, women's head basketball coach
Bob Bostad, football coach
Carlos Castillo-Chavez, professor of mathematics and biology
Arthur J. Crowns, politician
Steven E. Day, U.S. Coast Guard Rear Admiral
Michael Dombeck, former U.S. Forest Service Chief
Lawrence Eagleburger, former U.S. Secretary of State (attended)
R. Michael Ferrall, politician
J. P. Feyereisen, baseball player
Ted Fritsch, football player
Herbert J. Grover, educator and politician
William C. Hansen, educator and politician
David Helbach, politician
Brian Idalski, Olympic ice hockey coach
Kathy Kinney, television actress
Dale Klapmeier, Cirrus Aircraft CEO and co-founder
Greg Koch, guitarist
Anton C. Krembs, politician
Clint Kriewaldt, football player
Melvin Laird, former U.S. Secretary of Defense (attended)
Henry Leck, choral clinician and professor of music  
John A. List, economist
Edwin A. Loberg, U.S. Air Force Officer
Max Maxfield, politician
Scott May, baseball player
Pete McCann, guitarist
Mark Michie, U.S. National Guard Brigadier General
Scott D. Berrier, U.S. Army Lieutenant General
Lewis T. Mittness, politician
H. J. Mortensen, politician
William Murat, politician
Michael P. Nelson, professor of environmental philosophy and ethics 
John M. Noel, entrepreneur and philanthropist
Laura Osnes, actress
Jim Pekol, musician
Terry Porter, basketball player and coach
Ryan Ramczyk, football player
Bary Rose, football player
Patrick Rothfuss, author
Lolita Schneiders, politician
Donna J. Seidel, politician
Albert D. Shimek, politician
Brad Soderberg, men's head basketball coach
Mary Lou E. Van Dreel, politician
Daniel P. Vrakas, politician
Jordan Zimmermann, baseball player

Notable faculty
Dick Bennett (athletics department, 1976–85) – head basketball coach; later coached at the University of Wisconsin and Washington State University
J. Baird Callicott (philosophy department, 1965–94) – Distinguished Research Professor at the University of North Texas; co-founder of the academic environmental philosophy and ethics discipline
Louie Crew – English professor at Rutgers University
George Corneal – basketball, track and football coach
Lee Sherman Dreyfus (Chancellor, 1967–78) became the 40th Governor of Wisconsin
Eddie Kotal – head football, basketball, track and field, and boxing coach; former NFL player
Michael P. Nelson (philosophy department, 1992–2004) – environmental philosophy and ethics professor at Oregon State University; co-founder and director of the Conservation Ethics Group
Helen Parkhurst (Director of the Department for the Training of Primary Teachers, 1913-1915) – Originator of the Dalton Plan. She is known as "one of only 100 great educators for all time," with her name being among Socrates and Maria Montessori.
Benjamin Percy – writer of short stories, essays, comics, and screenplays
Patrick Rothfuss – writer of epic fantasy; books include The Name of the Wind, which won the 2007 Quill Award, and its sequel, The Wise Man's Fear, which topped The New York Times Best Seller list

References

External links

 
Educational institutions established in 1894
Forestry education
University of Wisconsins-Stevens Point
Education in Portage County, Wisconsin
Buildings and structures in Portage County, Wisconsin
Tourist attractions in Portage County, Wisconsin
1894 establishments in Wisconsin
University of Wisconsin-Stevens Point
Stevens Point